Baham Bar (also known as Bakhambar) is a village in Ziabar Rural District, in the Central District of Sowme'eh Sara County, Gilan Province, Iran. At the 2006 census, its population was 174, in 47 families.

References 

Populated places in Sowme'eh Sara County